Ain Zohra (Tarifit: Ɛin Zuhṛa, ⵄⵉⵏ ⵥⵓⵀⵕⴰ; Arabic:  عين الزهرة) is a commune in Driouch Province, Oriental, Morocco. At the time of the 2004 census, the commune had a total population of 11,258 people living in 1,754 households.

References

Populated places in Driouch Province
Rural communes of Oriental (Morocco)